Regina Beach Airport  is located  south of Regina Beach, Saskatchewan, Canada.

See also
List of airports in Saskatchewan

References

Registered aerodromes in Saskatchewan
Lumsden No. 189, Saskatchewan